El Hossein El Ouardi (born 22 September 1954) is a Moroccan politician of the Party of Progress and Socialism. From 3 January 2012 to 24 October 2017, he held the position of Minister of Health in Abdelilah Benkirane's government.

In January 2014, El Ouardi was physically assaulted while exiting the parliament in Rabat. His assailants were members of the pharmacists union/lobby, and one of them was the brother-in-law of Fouad Ali El Himma, the influential advisor and close-friend of Mohammed VI, in addition to being the cousin of Fatima-Zahra Mansouri, the then-mayor of Marrakesh belonging to the Authenticity and Modernity Party. The incident resulted in minor injuries for the minister.

See also
Cabinet of Morocco

References

External links

Living people
Government ministers of Morocco
1954 births
Riffian people
Party of Progress and Socialism politicians
Moroccan Berber politicians
20th-century Moroccan physicians
21st-century Moroccan physicians